Deans Dundas Bay is a Canadian Arctic waterway in the Northwest Territories.  It is an eastern arm of Prince of Wales Strait in Victoria Island's Prince Albert Peninsula, situated across from Banks Island.

References

Bays of the Northwest Territories